The 2004–05 season was the 116th season in the history of Sevilla FC and their fourth consecutive season in the top flight. The club participated in La Liga, the Copa del Rey, and the UEFA Cup.

Players

Pre-season and friendlies

Competitions

Overall record

La Liga

League table

Results summary

Results by round

Copa del Rey

UEFA Cup

First round

Group stage 

The group stage draw was held on 5 October 2004.

References 

Sevilla FC seasons
Sevilla